The U.S. District Court for the District of Maine (in case citations, D. Me.) is the U.S. district court for the state of Maine. The District of Maine was one of the original thirteen district courts established by the Judiciary Act of 1789, even though Maine was not a separate state from Massachusetts until 1820. The court is headquartered at the Edward T. Gignoux United States Courthouse in Portland, Maine and has a second courthouse in Bangor, Maine. 

The U.S. Attorney for the District of Maine represents the United States in criminal and civil litigation before the court.  the U.S. Attorney is Darcie N. McElwee.

Appeals from the District of Maine are heard by the United States Court of Appeals for the First Circuit (except for patent claims and claims against the U.S. government under the Tucker Act, which are appealed to the Federal Circuit).

History 
The District of Maine was one of the thirteen original districts created on September 24, 1789, by the Judiciary Act of 1789, . At the time, Maine was part of the state of Massachusetts. As with other jurisdictions of the time, the District of Maine was originally assigned a single judgeship. Not being assigned to a judicial circuit, it was granted the same jurisdiction as the United States circuit court, except in appeals and writs of error, which were the jurisdiction of the U.S. Circuit Court for the District of Massachusetts.

Current judges 
:

Former judges

Succession of seats

See also 
 Courts of Maine
 List of current United States district judges
 List of United States federal courthouses in Maine
 Maine Supreme Judicial Court

References

External links 
 United States District Court for the District of Maine

Maine
Portland, Maine
Bangor, Maine
1789 establishments in the United States
Courthouses in Maine
Courts and tribunals established in 1789
1820 establishments in Maine
Courts and tribunals established in 1820